Bulbophyllum kwangtungense is a species of orchid in the genus Bulbophyllum.

Cumulatin, densiflorol A and plicatol B are chemicals that can be isolated from the orchid.

References 

 The Bulbophyllum-Checklist

kwangtungense